OTU domain-containing protein 7B is a protein that in humans is encoded by the OTUD7B gene.

References

Further reading